Connate may refer to
 conjoined twins
 connation, in botany
 Connate fluids in geology